Apollo was launched in Bristol in 1819 as a West Indiaman. New owners in 1838 shifted her homeport to Dundee; she then sailed between Dundee and Montreal. In September 1843 she rescued the crew of a vessel that had foundered. Then in September 1846 a hurricane so damaged her that her crew and passengers abandoned her when two schooners came by and were able to rescue them.

Career
Apollo first appeared in Lloyd's Register (LR) in 1820.

In 1838 new owners moved Apollos homeport and registry to Dundee. 

Apollo, of Dundee, Walker, master, rescued the master and crew and brought them into Quebec.<ref>"Shipping Intelligence". Hull Packet and East Riding Times (Hull, England), 3 November 1843; Issue 3072.</ref>

FateApollo was on a voyage from Dundee to Montreal when a gale on 19 September 1846 in the Atlantic Ocean turned into a hurricane that washed a boy overboard and so damaged her that she was in danger of foundering. On 24 September the schooners Victoria and Paragon rescued the passengers and crew; Victoria took 23 to Waterford and Paragon took the rest.  LR for 1846 carried the annotation "Abandoned" by her name.

However, this may have been the wreck of another Apollo'' that was lost in December.

Citations and references
Citations

References
 

1819 ships
Ships built in Bristol
Age of Sail merchant ships of England
Maritime incidents in September 1843
Maritime incidents in September 1846